Capnogryllacris is a genus of leaf-rolling crickets in the subfamily Gryllacridinae and tribe Capnogryllacridini. Species are found in Far East and South Asia, which includes those previously placed in the obsolete genus Borneogryllacris (with B. globiceps now included in Glolarnaca).

Species
The Orthoptera Species File lists:

species group borneoensis (Haan, 1843)
 Capnogryllacris borneoensis (Haan, 1843)
 Capnogryllacris deschampsi (Bruner, 1915)
 Capnogryllacris discolor (Karny, 1928)
 Capnogryllacris fruhstorferi (Griffini, 1908)
 Capnogryllacris khmerica Gorochov, 2003
 Capnogryllacris plagiata (Walker, 1869)

species group fumigata (Haan, 1843)
 Capnogryllacris alivittata (Griffini, 1911)
 Capnogryllacris elongata (Fritze, 1908)
 Capnogryllacris fumigata (Haan, 1843)- type species (as Locusta fumigata Haan = C. fumigata fumigata)
 Capnogryllacris funebris (Brunner von Wattenwyl, 1898)
 Capnogryllacris gigantea Karny, 1937
 Capnogryllacris helocephala Gorochov, 2003
 Capnogryllacris humberti (Griffini, 1914)
 Capnogryllacris nigripennis (Gerstaecker, 1860)
 Capnogryllacris obscurata Karny, 1937
 Capnogryllacris phaeocephala Gorochov, 2003
 Capnogryllacris pictipes (Karny, 1925)
 Capnogryllacris proxima Gorochov, 2003

species group rubrocellata Gorochov, 2003
 Capnogryllacris rubrocellata Gorochov, 2003

no species group assigned
 Capnogryllacris annulicornis (Hebard, 1922)
 Capnogryllacris axinis Bian, Liu & Yang, 2021
 Capnogryllacris basaliatrata (Griffini, 1909)
 Capnogryllacris bimaculata (Li, Liu & Li, 2014)
 Capnogryllacris buttikoferi (Karny, 1931)
 Capnogryllacris erythrocephala Gorochov, 2003
 Capnogryllacris fasciculata (Pictet & Saussure, 1893)
 Capnogryllacris grassii (Griffini, 1912)
 Capnogryllacris khmerica Gorochov, 2015
 Capnogryllacris martha (Griffini, 1914)
 Capnogryllacris melanocrania (Karny, 1929)
 Capnogryllacris multifracta (Griffini, 1914)
 Capnogryllacris nanlingensis (Li, Liu & Li, 2014)
 Capnogryllacris nigromaculata Ingrisch, 2018
 Capnogryllacris nigromarginata (Karny, 1928)
 Capnogryllacris primigenii (Griffini, 1918)
 Capnogryllacris rufonotata (Li, Liu & Li, 2014)
 Capnogryllacris sakaerat Dawwrueng, Gorochov & Artchawakom, 2015
 Capnogryllacris sequestris Liu, Lu & Bian, 2022
 Capnogryllacris soror (Brunner von Wattenwyl, 1888)
 Capnogryllacris spinosa (Li, Liu & Li, 2014)
 Capnogryllacris superba (Brunner von Wattenwyl, 1888)
 Capnogryllacris thaica Gorochov & Dawwrueng, 2015
 Capnogryllacris varifrons Ingrisch, 2018
 Capnogryllacris xichou Peng & Bian, 2021

References

External links 
 Capnogryllacris at insectoid.info

Ensifera genera
Gryllacrididae
Orthoptera of Malesia
Orthoptera of Indo-China